Grasshopper Glacier is located in Shoshone National Forest, in the US state of Wyoming on the east of the Continental Divide in the Wind River Range. Grasshopper Glacier is in the Fitzpatrick Wilderness, and is part of the largest grouping of glaciers in the American Rocky Mountains. The glacier flows north, and glacial runoff supplies water to Grasshopper Creek, flowing eventually into the Wind River. The glacier shares a glacial margin with Klondike Glacier, located to the south. The glacier is named for grasshoppers that have been found entombed in the ice.

Between September 6 and 10, 2003, a glacial lake outburst flood (GLOF) was recorded when the proglacial lake at the head of the glacier burst through a glacial dam, and water from the lake carved a trench down the center of the glacier for over a half-mile (.8 km). The GLOF has been attributed to the rapid retreat of the glacier, which has been ongoing since the glacier was first accurately measured in the 1960s.

References

See also
 List of glaciers in the United States

Glaciers of Fremont County, Wyoming
Natural history of Wyoming
Natural history of North America
Shoshone National Forest
Glaciers of Wyoming